Anfu County is a county in the west of Jiangxi province, People's Republic of China. It is under the jurisdiction of the prefecture-level city of Ji'an.

Administrative divisions
In the present, Anfu County has 6 towns , 4 townships and 1 ethic township.
6 towns

4 townships

1 ethic township
 Jinping Ethnic Township

Demographics 

Culture

Cuisine
Anfu ham is an ancient dry-cured ham that originated in Anfu County and dates to the Qin dynasty.

Climate

Notes and references

External links 

 Official government site 

 
County-level divisions of Jiangxi